Jean (?) de Sainte-Colombe was a French composer and violist.  Sainte-Colombe was a celebrated master of the viola da gamba. He is credited (by Jean Rousseau in his Traité de la viole (1687)) with adding the seventh string, tuned to the note AA (A1 in scientific pitch notation), on the bass viol.

Life and works
Few details of his life are known; neither the names of his parents, nor his precise dates of birth and death are known. Recent research has revealed that his first name was Jean (other sources mention the name of Augustine of Autrecourt, Sieur de Sainte-Colombe) and also that he had as teacher the theorbo and viola player Nicolas Hotman.

Sainte-Colombe performed publicly in the Parisian Salons, as did most of his colleagues and Parisian music masters such as Le Sieur Dubuisson.  According to Titon du Tillet, he often performed in consort with his two daughters, and often with his own students, as attested by the copyist who wrote out his pieces for two viols as well as the solo-viol Tournus Manuscript.  Sainte-Colombe's most notable student was Marin Marais, who wrote Tombeau pour Monsieur de Sainte-Colombe, in 1701, as a memorial to his instructor. Sainte-Colombe's students also included the Sieur de Danoville, Jean Desfontaines, Pierre Méliton, Jean Rousseau and two women known only as Mlle Rougevillle and Mlle Vignon.

Amongst the extant works of Sainte-Colombe are sixty-seven Concerts à deux violes esgales, and over 170 pieces for solo seven-string viol, making him perhaps the most prolific French viol composer before Marin Marais.

Family history
It is speculated by various scholars that Monsieur de Sainte-Colombe was of Lyonnais or Burgundian petty nobility; and also the selfsame 'Jean de Sainte-Colombe' noted as the father of 'Monsieur de Sainte-Colombe le fils.'  This assumption was erroneous, according to subsequent research in Paris by American bass viol player and musicologist Jonathan Dunford. Dunford suggests he was probably from the Pau area in southernmost France and a Protestant, that his first name was "Jean" and that he had two daughters named Brigide and Françoise.

Contemporary references
In 1991, Pascal Quignard published a novel giving a conjectural picture of the relationship between M. de Sainte-Colombe and Marin Marais, entitled Tous les matins du monde (All the Mornings of the World). Alain Corneau directed a film based on it, with Jean-Pierre Marielle as Sainte-Colombe, Guillaume Depardieu as the young and Gérard Depardieu as the aged Marin Marais. The soundtrack of the film was realized by Jordi Savall.

A quotation from a composition of Monsieur de Sainte-Colombe is used in Carlo Forlivesi's Requiem (1999).

Notes

References
Connelly, Patrice (n.d.). . Archive from 22 November 2008, from http://www.violadagamba.org/html/treaties.html (accessed 28 April 2016).
 
Vaast, C., and F.P. Goy (1998), "Introduction", in Sainte-Colombe, Concerts à deux violes esgales (Ed. P. Hooreman, 2nd ed. revised by J. Dunford). Paris: Société Française de Musicologie.

External links

Hoasm.org biography
Mr. de Sainte Colombe, Concerts à deux violes esgales, Jordi Savall, Wieland Kuijken, Alia Vox AVSA 9885,
Mr. de Sainte Colombe le Fils - Six Suittes pour Basse de Viole seule avec le Tombeau pour Mons. de Sainte-Colombe le père, - Jordi Savall, basse de viole, Jean-Pierre Marielle, narrator, (Le Parnasse de la Viole, vol. I), Alia Vox 9827 A+B
Mr. de Sainte Colombe at medieval.org
Mr. de Sainte Colombe, Concerts à deux violes esgales, and solo suites by Jonathan Dunford, Astres Records

1640s births
1700 deaths
French Baroque composers
French Baroque viol players
French classical composers
French male classical composers
17th-century classical composers
17th-century male musicians